Roop's Fort, also known as Roop's Trading Post, Fort Defiance, and Roop House, is a historic building in Susanville, California. The building, which was built in 1854 by Isaac Roop, was the first building built by white settlers in Lassen County. The fort was originally a trading post for westbound migrants and was the first post west of Fort Hall in Idaho. The building also served as the capitol of the short-lived Nataqua Territory, a territory created in 1856 to avoid California tax collectors. The territory was incorporated into Roop County, Nevada, named for Isaac Roop, in 1861. California and Nevada entered into a border dispute known as the Sagebrush War over the Susanville area in 1863, and Roop's Fort served as a fort for the Nevadans during the skirmish. California won the war, and Roop's Fort became part of Lassen County in 1864.

It is a California Historical Landmark (#76), and it was listed on the National Register of Historic Places in 1974.

References

External links

Houses on the National Register of Historic Places in California
Houses completed in 1854
Historic American Buildings Survey in California
California Historical Landmarks
Houses in Lassen County, California
National Register of Historic Places in Lassen County, California